The cosmolabe was an ancient astronomical instrument resembling the astrolabe, formerly used for measuring the angles between heavenly bodies. It is also called pantacosm. Jacques Besson also uses this name, or universal instrument, for his invention described in Le cosmolabe (1567), which could be used for astrometry, cartography, navigation, and surveying.

Notes

References

Astronomical instruments
Astrometry
Astrological aspects
History of astrology